Marko Vešović (Serbian Cyrillic: Марко Вешовић; born 28 August 1991) is a Montenegrin professional footballer who plays as a right wing-back for Qarabağ FK and the Montenegro national team.

Club career

Early career
Born in what is now Podgorica, Montenegro, he spent a portion of his childhood in Lučani, where he played for the youth team of the local club Mladost Lučani. He made his senior debut with Budućnost in the 2008–09 season. He also had a half season loan spell at Mladost Podgorica.

Torino
On 30 January 2014, he signed with Italian side Torino on a free transfer, after a couple of days on trial under the manager Giampiero Ventura. He made his official debut for the Granata on 9 March 2014 during the trip to Milan against Inter, in which he was a starter, playing the full 90 minutes, lost 1–0. By the end of the 2013–14 season he made four appearances for Torino.

Rijeka
In summer 2014, he moved to Rijeka in Croatia's Prva HNL on a one-year loan. In the following year, Vešović returned to Rijeka. The transfer was facilitated through Rijeka's Italian partner club, Spezia Calcio in Serie B. On 18 September 2016, he scored a brace in a 5–2 victory for Rijeka over Dinamo Zagreb. Rijeka went on to win the Croatian First Football League in 2017; it was the first season in which Dinamo Zagreb did not finish first since 2005. Vešović was coached by Matjaž Kek during his three years at Rijeka.

Legia Warsaw
Vešović scored his first goal for Legia in a 2–1 win over Lech Poznań on 4 March 2018.

Qarabağ
On 16 July 2021, he signed with Qarabağ on a free transfer.

International career
After having been part of the Montenegrin U-19 team, Vešović was a regular player for Montenegro's U21 team between 2009 and 2013. On 20 May 2013, he was called up to the Montenegro national football team for the first time. After being an unused substitute in several games, he finally made his debut for Montenegro on 15 October 2013, as a substitute in the last match of the 2014 FIFA World Cup qualification against Moldova. On 1 September 2017, Vešović scored his first goal for Montenegro in a 3–0 away win over Kazakhstan as part of the 2018 FIFA World Cup qualification. As of 16 October 2020, he has earned a total of 30 caps, scoring 2 goals.

Personal life
His father Rade Vešović, also a football player and coach, died on 23 August 2019.

Career statistics

Club

International

International goals
Scores and results list Montenegro's goal tally first.

Honours
Red Star Belgrade
Serbian Cup (1): 2011–12

HNK Rijeka
Croatian First League (1): 2016–17
Croatian Cup (1): 2016–17

Legia Warsaw
Ekstraklasa (1): 2017–18
Polish Cup (1): 2017–18

Qarabağ FK
Azerbaijan Premier League: (1) 2021–22
Azerbaijan Cup: (1) 2021–22

References

External links

 

 Marko Vešović Stats at Utakmica.rs 

1991 births
Living people
Footballers from Podgorica
Association football fullbacks
Association football wingers
Montenegrin footballers
Montenegro youth international footballers
Montenegro under-21 international footballers
Montenegro international footballers
FK Budućnost Podgorica players
OFK Titograd players
Red Star Belgrade footballers
Torino F.C. players
HNK Rijeka players
HNK Rijeka II players
Legia Warsaw players
Montenegrin First League players
Serbian SuperLiga players
Serie A players
Croatian Football League players
Ekstraklasa players
Montenegrin expatriate footballers
Expatriate footballers in Serbia
Montenegrin expatriate sportspeople in Serbia
Expatriate footballers in Italy
Montenegrin expatriate sportspeople in Italy
Expatriate footballers in Croatia
Montenegrin expatriate sportspeople in Croatia
Expatriate footballers in Poland
Montenegrin expatriate sportspeople in Poland
Qarabağ FK players
Expatriate footballers in Azerbaijan
Montenegrin expatriate sportspeople in Azerbaijan